Kfar HaOranim (. lit. Village of the Pines), also known as Menora or Giv'at Ehud, is an Israeli settlement in the West Bank. Contiguous with Lapid and located near to the major city of Modi'in, it is organised as a community settlement and falls under the jurisdiction of Mateh Binyamin Regional Council.

The international community considers Israeli settlements in the West Bank illegal under international law, but the Israeli government disputes this.

History
Planning for the settlement (then named Giv'at Ehud, after Ehud Ben-Amitai, a fighter pilot killed in a training accident) began in 1981. The cornerstone was laid in 1984 at a ceremony attended by Prime Minister Yitzhak Shamir, by which time the name had changed to Menora. However, legal issues over the ownership of the land led to a delay in construction. The first residents finally moved in during October 1997.

According to ARIJ, Israel confiscated 682 dunams of land from the Palestinian village of Saffa for the construction of Menora/Kfar HaOranim.

References

Israeli settlements in the West Bank
Populated places established in 1997
Mateh Binyamin Regional Council
1997 establishments in the Palestinian territories
Community settlements